Yang River may refer to:

 Yang River (Yanghe), which flows into Yongding River in northern China
 Yang River (Yanghe), which flows into Jiaozhou Bay in Qingdao, Shandong Province, China
 Yang River (Yanghe, "Sunny River"), a tributary of the Xiaoqing River in Qingzhou, Shandong Province, China
 Lam Nam Yang in northeastern Thailand

See also
 Yangjiang, a city and prefecture in Guangdong, China, named for the Yang River